The sixth and last competition weekend of the 2019–20 ISU Speed Skating World Cup was held at Thialf in Heerenveen, the Netherlands, from Saturday, 7 March, until Sunday, 8 March 2020.

Medal summary

Men's events

 In mass start, race points are accumulated during the race based on results of the intermediate sprints and the final sprint. The skater with most race points is the winner.

Women's events

 In mass start, race points are accumulated during the race based on results of the intermediate sprints and the final sprint. The skater with most race points is the winner.

Mixed event

 Demonstration event. Teams will consist of one male and one female skater, from either the same or different national teams. Teams have to skate six laps in total, with the lady skating the first lap, the man skating the following two laps, the lady skating the fourth and the fifth lap and the man closing it of in the final lap. The relay to the other Skater in the team has to take place with a touch, and changeovers have to be done in the so-called relay zone between cones at the beginning of the finishing straight and before the entry to the corner after the finishing straight. The Team with the best time over 6 laps will be declared the winner. Team with the second-best time will be ranked second and so on.

References

6
ISU World Cup, 2019–20, 6

ISU
ISU